Fonqhwang Hairpin (Chinese:釵頭鳳 GwoRo:Chai Tou Fonq), titled Ci, is a type of lyric poetry in the Classical Chinese poetry tradition. It was originally called The Ci of Picking Followers (Chinese:撷芳詞 GwoRo:Shye Fang Tsyr), Cutting Red Followers (Chinese:擷紅英 GwoRo:Shye Hornging), Picking Red Followers (Chinese:摘紅英 GwoRo:Jeai Hornging), or Dividing Hairpin Sadly (Chinese:惜分釵 GwoRo:Siq Fen chai). Picking Followers-Strong Wind (Chinese:《擷芳詞·風搖動》) comes from Guujin Tsyr huah (Chinese:《古今詞話》) and is considered the standard form. The most famous Fonqhwang Hairpin was written by Lu You.

Rules and forms 
No set rule defines Ci. The song's context decides what changes are appropriate. Like other Ci, Fonqhwang Hairpin has many forms. In the following part, 'L' is used to express letel, 'C' to express contour, and 'M' means either one can do.

The standard form 
LLC MMC CLMCLLC LMC MLCC CCLM CLLC

LLC MLC MLMCMLC LLC MLC MMMM CLMC

(Picking followers-Strong Wind)

Variant 1 
LLC LCC CLCCLLC LLC LLC CCLL CLLC C C

LLC LLC CLCCLLC LLC LLC CCLL CLLC C C

(Fonqhwang Hairpin-Drink in Cold food festival)

Variant 2 
MLC LLC CMMCLLC CLL CLL CMLM MCLL L L

LLC LLC CLMCLLC CLL CLL CMMM MCLL L L

(Deviding Hairpin Sadly-drew the window)

The famous Ci of Fonqhwang Hairpin

Notes and references 

Chinese poetry forms